Willington is a former mining village in County Durham, England, in the foothills of the Pennines and near the River Wear close to Crook, Bishop Auckland and Durham City.

Like many communities in the area Willington's economy was largely based on coal mining. The closure of the colliery in 1967 therefore affected the local economy. Since 2000 the area has benefited from housing development and increased transportation links.

Although a handful of job opportunities remain, work for many residents is now located outside the village, and Willington functions largely as a satellite village for Bishop Auckland and Durham.

Governance
An electoral ward in the same name exists. The population of this ward at the 2011 Census was 9,147.

Parkside Academy

Is a coeducational secondary school. Parkside Academy has announced that they have been awarded "World Class School" status and that they are the only secondary school in County Durham to have received this award. To be eligible for World Class School mark a school must have already been rated "outstanding" by Ofsted. (ref Parkside Academy, World Class Schools.org)

Businesses
Along with a Co-operative supermarket, many small independent shops thrive in the village such as an independent butchers, a fruiterer, a hardware shop and a pet shop, as well as several restaurants. There are currently six pubs operating in the village, along with a small microbrewery, the Gambling Man Brewing Company. The east of the village is also home to a small industrial estate and a coking plant in place of the remains of the colliery entrance.

Football team
Willington has its own football club, Willington F.C., who currently play in the 11th tier of English football. Founded in 1906, the club won the Northern League in 1913-14, 1925–26 and 1929-1930, but have struggled more in recent years, having been relegated to the Wearside League where they continued to struggle.

Their most recent highlight was featuring in the Wearside Football League Cup final in 2011, where they were eventually beaten by Ryhope Colliery Welfare 4-2 on penalties.

Willington F.C. have reached the final of the FA Amateur Cup twice. In 1939, they lost 3-0 to Bishop Auckland at Roker Park, Sunderland. In 1950 Willington beat Bishop Auckland 4-0 at Wembley

Notable figures
George Burdon McKean was born in the village in 1888, moving to Canada in 1902. He returned to England in WW1 as a private soldier in the Canadian Expeditionary Force.
His first gallantry award was as an NCO, in 1917, when he won the Military Medal. A year later, as a commissioned officer, he was involved in a trench raid for which he was awarded the Victoria Cross. 
He was also one of a small number of soldiers to be awarded both the Military Medal & the Military Cross - having served as a both a junior rank and an officer.

His Victoria Cross award was recently celebrated with the unveiling of a memorial stone in the main street of the village, near to the library.

References

 
Towns in County Durham